Rudzienko may refer to:

Rudzienko, Lublin Voivodeship (east Poland)
Rudzienko, Mińsk County in Masovian Voivodeship (east-central Poland)
Rudzienko, Otwock County in Masovian Voivodeship (east-central Poland)
Rudzienko-Kolonia